Oeceoclades decaryana is a terrestrial orchid species of the genus Oeceoclades that is native throughout southern and southeastern Africa. It can be found growing in Kenya, Mozambique, Zimbabwe, Madagascar, and KwaZulu-Natal in South Africa. It was first described by the French botanist Joseph Marie Henry Alfred Perrier de la Bâthie in 1935 as a species in the genus Eulophia. He later transferred this species to the genus Lissochilus in 1941, followed by another transfer to the genus Eulophidium in 1957 by the English botanist V.S. Summerhayes in 1957. When Leslie Andrew Garay and Peter Taylor revised the genus Oeceoclades in 1976, they transferred this species to the expanded Oeceoclades.

References

decaryana
Flora of Kenya
Flora of Mozambique
Flora of South Africa
Flora of Zimbabwe
Orchids of Madagascar
Plants described in 1935